José Tadeo Monagas International Airport  is an airport serving Maturín, the capital of the state of Monagas in Venezuela.

The runway has an additional  of paved overrun on its southwestern end.

The Monagas VOR-DME (Ident: MUN) and non-directional beacon (Ident: MUN) are located on the field.

Airlines and destinations

See also
Transport in Venezuela
List of airports in Venezuela

References

External links
SkyVector - Maturin
OpenStreetMap - Maturin
OurAirports - Maturin

Airports in Venezuela
Buildings and structures in Monagas
Buildings and structures in Maturín